Babelomurex hirasei is a species of sea snail, a marine gastropod mollusc in the family Muricidae, the murex snails or rock snails.

Description
The height of the shell varies between 18 mm and 50 mm.

Distribution
This marine species occurs off Japan and the Philippines.

References

 Oliverio M. (2008) Coralliophilinae (Neogastropoda: Muricidae) from the southwest Pacific. In: V. Héros, R.H. Cowie & P. Bouchet (eds), Tropical Deep-Sea Benthos 25. Mémoires du Muséum National d'Histoire Naturelle 196: 481–585. page(s): 520

External links
 

hirasei
Gastropods described in 1964